Tarczyński (feminine: Tarczyńska, plural: Tarczyńscy) is a Polish surname. Tarczyński surname is derived from the town Tarczyn. Notable people with the name include:

 Agata Tarczyńska (born 1988), Polish footballer
 Dawid Tarczyński, American football player, 2010 PLFA season final MVP
 Dominik Tarczyński (born 1979), Polish politician and journalist 
 Jacek Tarczyński (born 1962), butcher, Tarczyński Group founder
 Kazimierz Tarczyński, 1956 Rally Poland
 Marcin Tarczyński (born 1990), Polish swimmer
 Tadeusz Tarczyński, Tarczyński and Stępniewki TS-1/34 Promyk designer
 Trevor Tarczynski, art designer
  (born 1960), University of Szczecin rector

Other 
 Tarczyński and Stępniewki TS-1/34 Promyk, Polish short span, high performance sailplane
 Tarczyński Group, corporate group of enterprises specialising in the meat industry
 Tarczyński Arena Wrocław, stadium opened in 2011 in Wrocław

Polish-language surnames
Polish toponymic surnames